Sampath Nandi (born 20 June 1980) is an Indian film director, screenwriter and producer who works primarily in Telugu cinema.

Career

After completing his bachelor's degree in Pharmacy (B.Pharm) from the V.L. College of Pharmacy, Nandi assisted Posani Krishna Murali for about three years. In the meantime he used to make ad-films in Mumbai and Bengaluru.

In 2010, Nandi made his directorial debut with Yemaindi Ee Vela, starring Varun Sandesh and Nisha Aggarwal. It was a remarkable debut with a run of 50days in 32 centers. His second film was 2012's Racha, starring Ram Charan and Tamannaah Bhatia which turned to be a blockbuster. The film successfully completed a 50-day run in 127 direct centers across Andhra Pradesh. and completed a 100-day run in 38 centers across Andhra Pradesh on 13 July 2012 which is a unique feat. The film collected a lifetime share of 

In 2015, Nandi directed Ravi Teja's film Bengal Tiger, which has Tamannaah and Raashi Khanna as lead actresses. Bengal Tiger released worldwide on 10 December 2015. In 2017, Nandi's directorial Goutham Nanda starring Gopichand, Catherine Tresa and Hansika Motwani was released. 

Sampath Nandi teamed up with Gopichand for the commercial entertainer Seetimaar which is film based on Indian sport Kabaddi. The film's principal shooting started in December 2019 but inadvertently got postponed due to the pandemic that took over in 2020. The film had a theatrical release on September 10, 2021 and opened to positive reviews. Seetimaarr got its OTT release on October 15, 2021. The film's satellite rights were bagged by Gemini TV.

Filmography

References

Sources
1 ^ 
2 ^ 
3 ^ 
4 ^ 
5 ^ 
6 ^

External links

Sampath Nandi on https://twitter.com/IamSampathNandi
Sampath Nandi on https://www.instagram.com/isampathnandi/

1980 births
Film directors from Telangana
Telugu film producers
Telugu film directors
Living people
Film producers from Telangana
People from Karimnagar district
Telugu screenwriters
Screenwriters from Telangana
Indian film directors
21st-century Indian film directors
|}